Julien Benneteau and Nicolas Mahut won in the final 7–6(7–2), 6–3 against Michaël Llodra and Fabrice Santoro.

Seeds

  Michaël Llodra /  Fabrice Santoro (final)
  Gastón Etlis /  Martín Rodríguez (first round)
  Lucas Arnold /  Mariano Hood (first round)
  Simon Aspelin /  Massimo Bertolini (quarterfinals)

Draw

External links
 2003 Open de Moselle Doubles Draw

2003 Open de Moselle